Auximobasis invigorata is a moth in the family Blastobasidae. It was described by Edward Meyrick in 1932. It is found on the Virgin Islands.

References

Blastobasidae
Moths described in 1932